Robert Gene Rembert, Jr. (born March 15, 1970) is an American serial killer who committed a series of at least 5 murders in Cleveland, Ohio from 1997 to 2015. He was arrested thanks to DNA profiling, fully admitting his guilt at trial, for which he was sentenced to  life imprisonment with a chance for parole in 30 years.

Authorities from Pennsylvania suspect Rembert of killing many more women while he was traveling there for his job as a truck driver. He is also suspected of killing more women in Cleveland and other local Ohio cities and towns.

Early life 
Robert Gene Rembert Jr. was born on March 15, 1970 in Cleveland, Ohio to father Robert Gene Rembert Sr. and an unknown mother. Little else is known about Rembert's childhood.

1997 murder 
On December 23, 1997, Rembert, a then 27-year-old who worked as a Cleveland bus driver, got into an argument with 24-year-old Dadren Lewis at a parking lot, which resulted in Lewis being shot. At trial, his lawyers managed to convince the judge that it was unintentional, and in 1998, Robert was found guilty of manslaughter and served 6 years in jail. Rembert was released in 2004 and after, he returned to Cleveland and found a job as a truck driver, frequently abusing alcohol and living on modest means. At the time of his arrest, he was having financial difficulties and problems with housing, due to which, shortly before his arrest, he had to live with relatives and friends.

2015 murders 
On September 21, 2015, Rembert was pulled over by police at a truck service stop in Medina County outside Cleveland. He was driving an SUV that belonged to 26-year-old Morgan Nietzel, whose body had been found shot to death the previous day in her Cleveland home, along with the body of 52-year-old Jerry Rembert, Robert's cousin who was providing lodging for Robert. After his arrest, Robert admitted that on the previous evening, he got into an argument with his cousin Jerry, during which he shot him and Nietzel, a mutual friend of the two. After he killed them, Rembert stole several items and Morgan's car.

Exposure 
During the subsequent investigation, a blood and saliva sample was taken from Robert for testing. Based on results from a complete DNA profiling test, Rembert was linked to the murder of 31-year-old Kimberly Hall, who was found beaten and raped on June 10 of that year, and an older murder dating back to May 1997, when 47-year-old Rita May Payne was killed in Cleveland. Both women were prostitutes.

Rembert accepted a plea bargain from the authorities, admitting to all the killings and providing details for each. He said that at the time of the Payne murder, he was working as a bus driver and killed the woman by luring her into a public service toilet at the Cleveland bus station. Despite the fact that bus drivers and station workers were investigated, Robert slipped by unnoticed. Due to his job as a truck driver, visiting many cities in Ohio and Pennsylvania, he was investigated in the murders of several other girls and women who were engaged in prostitution and were killed under similar circumstances. So far, no new charges have been brought against him.

Trial 
On the basis of the plea bargain, Rembert was found guilty of four murders and on October 16, 2018, received a life imprisonment term with a chance of parole after 30 years. During the sentencing, he expressed remorse for what he had done and asked for forgiveness from the victims' relatives.

See also 
 List of serial killers in the United States

References 

1970 births
20th-century African-American people
20th-century American criminals
21st-century African-American people
21st-century American criminals
American male criminals
American people convicted of murder
American people convicted of manslaughter
American prisoners sentenced to life imprisonment
American rapists
American serial killers
Criminals from Ohio
Living people
Male serial killers
People convicted of murder by Ohio
People from Cleveland
Prisoners sentenced to life imprisonment by Ohio